The following is an incomplete list of starting quarterbacks for the Montreal Alouettes of the Canadian Football League that have started a regular season game for the team. This list does not include preseason nor postseason appearances. They are listed in order of most starts with any tiebreaker being the date of each player's first start at quarterback for the Alouettes.

Regular season

Where known, the number of games they started during the season is listed to the right:

 * - Indicates that the number of starts is not known for that year for each quarterback

References
 The Pro Football Archives
 CFLapedia
 Stats Crew

Montreal Alouettes
Starting quarterbacks